The 1968 NCAA University Division baseball tournament was played at the end of the 1968 NCAA University Division baseball season to determine the national champion of college baseball.  The tournament concluded with eight teams competing in the College World Series, a double-elimination tournament in its twenty-second year.  Eight regional districts sent representatives to the College World Series with preliminary rounds within each district serving to determine each representative.  These events would later become known as regionals.  Each district had its own format for selecting teams, resulting in 27 teams participating in the tournament at the conclusion of their regular season, and in some cases, after a conference tournament.  The twenty-second tournament's champion was the Southern California, coached by Rod Dedeaux.  The Most Outstanding Player was Bill Seinsoth of the Southern California.

Tournament
The opening rounds of the tournament were played across eight district sites across the country, each consisting of between two and four teams. The winners of each District advanced to the College World Series.

Bold indicates winner.

District 1 at Storrs, CT

District 2 at Princeton, NJ

District 3 at Gastonia, NC

District 4 at Minneapolis, MN

District 5 at Stillwater, OK

District 6 at Austin, TX

District 7 at Ogden, UT

District 8 at Los Angeles, CA

College World Series

Participants

Results

Bracket

Game results

All-Tournament Team
The following players were members of the All-Tournament Team.

Notable players
 BYU: Ken Crosby, Doug Howard
 Harvard: Ray Peters, Pete Varney
 NC State: Mike Caldwell, Tommy Smith
 Oklahoma State: Danny Thompson
 USC: Jim Barr, Bill Lee, Brent Strom
 Southern Illinois: Skip Pitlock, Mike Rogodzinski
 St. John's: 
 Texas: Larry Hardy

See also
 1968 NCAA College Division baseball tournament (inaugural edition)
 1968 NAIA World Series

References

NCAA Division I Baseball Championship
1968 NCAA University Division baseball season
Baseball in Austin, Texas